Gunthwaite is a hamlet in the civil parish of Gunthwaite and Ingbirchworth, in the Barnsley district, in South Yorkshire, England. It is on the boundary of Kirklees in West Yorkshire. 

The settlement can be traced back over 1,000 years.

Within the parish is located Gunthwaite Hall, former seat of the Bosville family. Its 16th century Grade I listed close-studded cruck barn is still in agricultural use and has been described as "one of the glories of the parish." Also to be found nearby is Gunthwaite Spa, a sulphur-rich spring whose waters emerge from a pipe set in a stone recess by the side of Carr Lane. Here, the old practice of celebrating Spaw Sunday still survives to this day.

See also
Listed buildings in Gunthwaite and Ingbirchworth

References

External links

Hamlets in South Yorkshire
Geography of the Metropolitan Borough of Barnsley